Djupadal  Manor is a manor house located in Ronneby Municipality in Blekinge, Sweden. 
It is probably built in the early 17th century. From 1838, Djupadal belonged to Casper Wrede af Elimä (1808-1877). From the early 1900s, the Petri family became part owners.

References

Buildings and structures in Blekinge County
Houses completed in 1600
Manor houses in Sweden